The Smolnyy or Smol'nyy (Russian Смольный) class, Soviet designation Project 887, are training ships built for the Soviet Navy in the late 1970s. Two ships are operated by the Baltic Fleet of the Russian Navy.

Design

The ships were designed to provide seagoing training facilities for the Soviet Navy. The ships have accommodation for 30 instructors and 300 cadets. They have a basic armament for self-defense and patrol duties.

Ships

The ships were built in Szczecin, Poland for the Soviet Navy

Smolnyy (Смольный) - Launched 1976, Commissioned 1977, in service with the Baltic Fleet
Perekop (Перекоп) - Commissioned 1978, in service with the Baltic Fleet
Khasan (Хасан) - Commissioned 1980, Retired 1999 and scrapped

See also
List of ships of the Soviet Navy
List of ships of Russia by project number

References

warfare.ru
Russian Language page
English Language page

Poland–Soviet Union relations
 
Training ships of the Russian Navy
Auxiliary ships of the Soviet Navy
Ships built in Szczecin
Auxiliary training ship classes
Naval ships built in Poland for export